Vestal may refer to:

 Pertaining to Vesta (mythology), a Roman goddess
 The sacred fire of Vesta
 The Temple of Vesta
 Vestal Virgin, a priestess of Vesta
 Vestalia, an ancient Roman religious festival in honor of Vesta
 Vestal, New York
 HMS Vestal, the name of eight ships of the Royal Navy
 USS Vestal (AR-4), a US Navy ship
 Vestal moth
Rhodometra sacraria, a moth of Europe, Africa and Asia of the family Geometridae
Antaeotricha albulella, a moth of the United States of the family Depressariidae
Cabera variolaria, a moth of North America of the family Geometridae
 Albert Henry Vestal (1875-1932), American politician
 Samuel Vestal (1844-1928), American politician
 Vestal Goodman (1929-2003), an American gospel singer
 The Vestal, a ballet by Marius Petipa and Mikhail Ivanov
 Vestal Watches, a fashion watch brand

See also 
 Vesta (disambiguation)